The Democracy at Home Party or Democracy at Home Political Party (PPDA) is a populist political party in the Republic of Moldova.

History
The Democracy at Home Party was established on 31 July 2011, but it was officially registered on 2 September. It is the legal successor of the "Democracy at Home" Youth Movement. Its president is Vasile Costiuc and it is a party with a populist ideology. It is also a "syndicalist" party, meaning that it supports the unification of Romania and Moldova.

The party participated in the 2019 Moldovan parliamentary election, obtaining the 11th place with a total of 4,463 (0.32%) votes. This represented an increase of 0.17% from the 2014 Moldovan parliamentary election, but this was not enough to exceed the minimum of 6% of the votes to enter the Parliament of Moldova.

The PPDA was part of the Mișcarea Politică Unirea (MPU), a political party established on 15 January 2020 to unite Moldova with Romania together with four other Moldovan political parties. At the time of its establishment, Costiuc declared that this was the first step towards "the constitution of a large movement, with national support" and that its aim was "to stop the expansionism of the Russian Empire". The MPU participated in the 2020 Moldovan presidential election through its candidate Dorin Chirtoacă. However, on 30 April 2021, the PPDA left the coalition composing the MPU as Costiuc considered the trajectories and objectives of both were not the same.

See also
 Politics of Moldova

References

External links
  

2011 establishments in Moldova
Political parties established in 2011
Populist parties
Pro-European political parties in Moldova
Romanian nationalism in Moldova